Sam Steel (born February 3, 1998) is a Canadian professional ice hockey centre who currently plays for the  Minnesota Wild of the National Hockey League (NHL). Steel was selected 30th overall in the 2016 NHL Entry Draft by the Anaheim Ducks.

Playing career
Steel first played junior hockey as a youth in his hometown of Sherwood Park, Alberta. While playing for and captaining the Sherwood Park AAA Flyers, Steel was selected with the second overall pick in the 2013 Western Hockey League (WHL) Bantam draft by the Regina Pats. On August 28, 2013, he signed a standard player contract with the Pats. After appearing with the Sherwood Park Crusaders of the Alberta Junior Hockey League (AJHL), Steel completed the 2013–14 season by making his WHL debut with the Regina Pats, featuring in five games.

After the completion of his second full major junior season with Regina in 2015–16, Steel was selected in the same position he was ranked by the NHL Central Scouting, as the final pick of the first round (30th overall) of the 2016 NHL Entry Draft by the Anaheim Ducks. The Ducks previously traded goaltender Frederik Andersen to the Toronto Maple Leafs to obtain the selection used to select Steel. On December 21, 2016, Steel signed a three-year, entry-level contract with Anaheim.

After an impressive 2016–17 season in which he led the WHL in scoring, Steel was awarded the Four Broncos Memorial Trophy as WHL Player of the Year.

In his final season with the Pats, as a member of the Memorial Cup host team, and despite a 1-2 round robin record, Steel led the hosts to the final, ultimately losing the national championship to Acadie-Bathurst. While not on the championship winning team, Steel was awarded MVP of the tournament.

Steel joined the Ducks for their 2018–19 season, making his NHL debut on October 3 in a game against the San Jose Sharks. He recorded his first career NHL goal in a 4–2 loss to the Buffalo Sabres on October 21. Steel recorded his first career NHL hat-trick in a 5–4 win over the Vancouver Canucks on March 26, 2019, becoming the youngest player in Ducks history to score a regular season hat-trick.

On August 30, 2022, it was announced that Steel had signed a one-year contract with the Minnesota Wild.

International play

On December 15, 2017, Steel was named to the 22-man roster to represent Canada at the IIHF World U20 Championship.

Personal life
Steel's older brother Patrick also played hockey. While playing Junior A hockey in 2011, Patrick died from an undetected heart problem.

Career statistics

Regular season and playoffs

International

Awards and honours

References

External links

1998 births
Living people
Anaheim Ducks draft picks
Anaheim Ducks players
Canadian expatriate ice hockey players in the United States
Canadian ice hockey centres
Ice hockey people from Alberta
Minnesota Wild players
National Hockey League first-round draft picks
Regina Pats players
San Diego Gulls (AHL) players
Sportspeople from Sherwood Park